Mike Samples (born May 27, 1950) is a former professional Canadian football player who played eleven seasons in the Canadian Football League for three teams. He was named CFL All-Star in 1981.   In August 1983 he retired as a player and became an assistant coach for the Saskatchewan Roughriders.

References

1950 births
Living people
American players of Canadian football
BC Lions players
Canadian football defensive linemen
Drake Bulldogs football players
Drake University alumni
Hamilton Tiger-Cats players
People from Bonne Terre, Missouri
Saskatchewan Roughriders players
Players of American football from Missouri